The 2007 WNBA season was the eighth for the Seattle Storm. The Storm struggled through the season, but they were able to reach the playoffs, falling in the first round to eventual champion, Phoenix Mercury.

Offseason

Dispersal Draft
Based on the Storm's 2006 record, they would pick 7th in the Charlotte Sting dispersal draft. The Storm picked Tye'sha Fluker.

WNBA Draft

Regular season

Season standings

Season schedule

Playoffs

Player stats

Awards and honors
Lauren Jackson, WNBA Most Valuable Player Award
Lauren Jackson, WNBA Defensive Player of the Year Award
Lauren Jackson, WNBA Peak Performer (Points)
Lauren Jackson, WNBA Peak Performer (Rebounds)

References

External links
 Storm on Basketball Reference

Seattle Storm seasons
Seattle
2007 in sports in Washington (state)